Al Rehan or  is a small village located in the southern part of Lebanon, on Al Rehan mountain in Jezzine District. The village is surrounded by mountain peaks, pine and oak forests. Its altitude ranges from 740 to 1605 m and is 83 km from the capital Beirut.

Etymology
Al Rehan (pronounced /Al re-han) is the village's name in Arabic and refers to its namesake, Mount Rehan. Both village and mount are named after the Basil (Rehan in Arabic) plant that grows abundantly in the area.

History
In  the 1596 tax records, it was named as a village,  'Wad Rihan, in the Ottoman nahiya (subdistrict) of  Sagif   under the liwa' (district) of Safad, with a population of  47 households, all Muslim. The villagers  taxes on agricultural products, such as  goats and beehives, in addition to "occasional revenues" and a fixed sum; a total of 4,250  akçe.

Demographics

Its closest neighbouring villages are Aramta, Sujod and Ayshiya. Additionally, mountains outside the Lebanese boundaries can be seen from the top of the village and specifically from the Al Ksayri area. 
The number of people inhabiting the village is estimated to be approximately 5000 people of Lebanese descent. Its inhabitants are also spread all over the world where most have migrated to various countries in the Middle East, Africa, North and South America, Canada and Europe.

Flora and fauna

The village is mostly known for its abundance in water, cool weather in the summer season and beautiful natural sceneries. The temperature is at its most comfortable from April through June, and from mid-August to October.

One walking through the village will find evergreen trees such as cypress and oak. Fruits such as figs, cherry, apricot, peach, some watermelons and plums.
The village was recently assigned its own protected natural reserve.

The village is also home to walnut, pine nut and chestnut trees. Figs and olives are considered some of Rihans most important trees and are found in nearly every garden.

Various species of animals and birds can be encountered. Porcupines, golden jackals and wild boars are familiar sights. Foxes and striped hyenas are present although very rare to see.

Birds of prey such as buzzards are frequently found roaming the skies looking for wood mice, snakes or moles. The griffon vulture is present and with no human interference to its nesting areas.

Passerine birds like goldfinch (حسون), swallows (سنونو), house sparrows (دوري), hoopoes (هدهد) and many more flourish in the village’s trees and gardens. During the day bulbuls are often heard singing.

Chukars (حجل) are also found and can be hunted for sports.

Landmarks

The village is home to two different interconnected karstic limestone caves with stalactite and stalagmite formations.

Rehans cave is the smaller of the two and was discovered by a local at the end of the 1930s. It was only in 1951 that the local villagers were able to fully visit the cave, discovering its naturally carved statues, multiple rooms, passages and, of course, its beauty. It is widely known as Jeita of the south for its resemblance to the Jeita Grotto.

Recent Topography showed that the cave is approximately 185 m long. Although very inviting for the locals, they cannot go further than a 110 m since they are mal equipped and air and light become very scarce.

It is believed to be connected with the second and larger winter spring cave but there's no evidence of this claim yet.

The winter spring cave  is a 4.1 kilometers long cave found in what is called Khazem's Tract.
Discovered in 1956, it is the 4th largest cave in Lebanon and the biggest of South Lebanon.

References

Bibliography

External links
Rihan (Jezzine), Localiban
    

Populated places in Jezzine District